The Infinix Hot 9 Pro is an Android based smartphone released in June 2020 by Infinix. It is a budget smartphone with Android 10. It comes with 4 GB RAM and 64 GB internal storage.

Specifications

Main Camera

The Infinix Hot 9 Pro has a 48 MP camera, a 2 MP depth camera, a 2 MP macro camera and a QVGA (low light sensor) camera. It can record video in 1080p @ 30fps. It also has Quad-LED flash, HDR and panorama.

Selfie camera

The Infinix Hot 9 Pro has an 8 MP single selfie camera that can also record video in 1080p @ 30fps. It also has a LED flash.

Operating system

The Infinix Hot 9 Pro comes with Android 10 operating system based on XOS 6.0.

Hardware

The Infinix Hot 9 Pro has a Mediatek Helio P22 (12 nm) chipset, Octa-core 2.0 GHz Cortex-A53 CPU and PowerVR GE8320 GPU.

Memory

The Infinix Hot 9 Pro has 64GB internal storage and 4GB RAM. It also supports microSDXC card.

Battery

The Infinix Hot 9 Pro has a 5000 mAh lithium polymer non-removable battery.

Display

The Infinix Hot 9 Pro has a 6.6 inch IPS LCD display with ~266 ppi density. Its resolution is 720 × 1600 pixels, and ratio is 20:9.

Body

The Infinix Hot 9 Pro's dimensions are  165 x 76.8 x 8.7 mm. Its weight is 185 g (6.53 oz) and it has plastic frame and plastic back.

Connectivity

The Infinix Hot 9 Pro supports Wi-Fi, Bluetooth, GPS, and FM Radio. It also supports 2G, 3G and 4G LTE LTE networks.

See also
 Infinix Mobile
 XOS (operating system)

References 

Android (operating system) devices
Mobile phones introduced in 2020
Mobile phones with multiple rear cameras
Infinix smartphones